Mühlanger is a village and a former municipality in Wittenberg district in Saxony-Anhalt, Germany. Since 1 January 2014, it is part of the town Zahna-Elster. From 1 January 2011 until 29 May 2013, it was also part of Zahna-Elster, but this was reverted by court decision. Previously the municipality belonged to the administrative municipality (Verwaltungsgemeinschaft) of Elbaue-Fläming.

Geography
Mühlanger lies about 9 km east of Lutherstadt Wittenberg on the Elbe. It has three subdivisions: Hohndorf, Prühlitz and Gallin. Federal Highway (Bundesstraße) B 187 running from Wittenberg to Jessen runs right through the community.

History
Hohndorf had its first documentary mention in 1304. The municipality Mühlanger was founded in 1939 by uniting the villages of Prühlitz and Hohndorf. Gallin was amalgamated in 1974.

Regular events
The Park and Homeland Festival takes place yearly in early July.

References

Former municipalities in Saxony-Anhalt
Zahna-Elster